There are 1,956 urban areas in Sweden as defined by Statistics Sweden on 31 December 2010. The official term used by Statistics Sweden is "locality" instead of "urban area" and they are defined as having a minimum of 200 inhabitants. The total population of the localities was 8,016,000 in 2010, which made up 85% of the population of the whole country.

The urban areas made up 1.3% of the land area of the whole country. The average population density of the urban areas was 1,491 inhabitants per square kilometre (km2).

References
General
 
Notes

Demographics of Sweden
 
 
Lists of populated places in Sweden